Adventure Time: Distant Lands is an American animated limited series based on the animated television series Adventure Time, which was created by Pendleton Ward and originally aired on Cartoon Network from 2010 to 2018. Distant Lands, which comprises four hour-long streaming television specials, was produced by Frederator Studios and Cartoon Network Studios; the first special was released on HBO Max on June 25, 2020. The rest of the specials were released on November 19, 2020, May 20, 2021, and September 2, 2021.

The series at large follows the adventures of Finn (a human boy) and his best friend and adoptive brother Jake, a dog with magical powers to change shape and size at will. Finn and Jake live in the post-apocalyptic Land of Ooo, where they interact with the series' other main characters, including Princess Bubblegum, Marceline the Vampire Queen, and BMO. Distant Lands focuses on new and returning characters in previously unexplored areas of the Adventure Time universe.

Production

Concept 
The series follows the adventures of Finn the Human (a boy), and his best friend and brother Jake, a dog with magical powers to change shape and size at will. Finn and Jake live in the post-apocalyptic Land of Ooo, where they interact with the other major characters, such as Princess Bubblegum, Marceline the Vampire Queen, and BMO. Common storylines revolve around Finn and Jake going on the titular adventures, discovering strange creatures, and battling monsters to help others.

Background 
On September 29, 2016, Cartoon Network officially announced that Adventure Time would end. Storyline writing for the initial series ended in mid-November 2016, and the show's final script was pitched to storyboarders on November 28. Voice recording for the initial series ended on January 31, 2017. Several of the show's crew members were then hired for Cartoon Network's Summer Camp Island, created by Adventure Time storyline writer Julia Pott. The Adventure Time finale, "Come Along with Me", aired on September 3, 2018, to a largely positive reception.

Development and Casting 
The Adventure Time: Distant Lands specials, like the original series, were a co-production between Frederator Studios and Cartoon Network Studios, but unlike the previous seasons, the specials debuted on HBO Max, the video on demand service from WarnerMedia Entertainment. The Distant Lands specials have their origin during the production of the show's tenth season. Because the show had had success with specials and miniseries in the past (such as Stakes and Elements), the writers started to pitch a number of stories that could be told in longer formats. Two big ideas that emerged during this time were storylines focusing on BMO in space, and another focusing on Marceline and Bubblegum's relationship. Production for these longer stories, however, was halted when the series was cancelled. Later, when HBO and Cartoon Network began to revive the series for the HBO Max streaming service, the Adventure Time writers went back to these old ideas, and in time they generated the four Distant Lands specials.

Many of the cast from the original series returned for the specials, including Jeremy Shada as Finn the Human, John DiMaggio as Jake the Dog, Niki Yang as BMO, Hynden Walch as Princess Bubblegum, Olivia Olson as Marceline the Vampire Queen, and Steve Little as Peppermint Butler. New characters included Glory Curda as Y5 and Simone Giertz as CGO; both of them were already fans of Adventure Time before joining the cast. Guest voices include returning cast members Maria Bamford, Ashly Burch, and Ron Perlman, as well as Randall Park, Stephen Root, John Hodgman, David Bradley, Chris Fleming, Isabelle Fuhrman, Andy Daly, Ron Lynch, Tom Scharpling, Bill Hader, Julia Butters, Patti Harrison, Toks Olagundoye, Edi Patterson, Bex Taylor-Klaus, Dana Snyder, Duncan Trussell, SungWon Cho, and Anthony Head.

Longtime Adventure Time executive producer Adam Muto returned to oversee the production of the specials, with Jack Pendarvis, Anthony Burch, Jesse Moynihan, Christina Catucci, Charley Feldman, and Kate Tsang serving as part of the writing staff. Storyboard artists who worked on these specials include (but are not limited to): Ashlyn Anstee, Jim Campbell, Iggy Craig, Megan Fisher, Laura Knetzger, Hanna K. Nyström, Maya Petersen, Anna Syvertsson, Mickey Quinn, and Serena Wu. Miki Brewster served as supervising director for the specials. From June to September 2019, Jenny Goldberg briefly served as art director for the specials, after which original series art director Sandra Lee served in that role. On April 21, 2021, HBO Max announced that the airing sequence of "Wizard City" and "Together Again" would be switched, with the latter airing before the former. After this announcement, Adam Muto explained that, initially, only three specials had been ordered, but that "Wizard City" was added on later and was the actual last special to be made.

The end credits of the final special "Together Again" feature a dedication to four deceased members of the show's cast and crew: Polly Lou Livingston, Miguel Ferrer, Michel Lyman, and Maureen Mlynarczyk. Livingston and Ferrer had provided the voices for Tree Trunks and Death, respectively. Lyman and Mlynarczyk, on the other hand, were both sheet timers on the original series and Emmy Awards winners.

Episodes

Reception

Reviews

"BMO" 
Reception to "BMO" has been mostly positive. Rollin Bishop of Comic Book wrote that the special's biggest strength is that BMO is "the most innocent and also the most prone to misadventure" compared to the other Adventure Time characters, which made the special itself a "solid watch from start to finish." Others called "BMO" a "blend of dream logic, comedy, and surreal heroism". Other reviewers praised the show for recapturing the magic of the original show, with Petrana Radulovic of Polygon arguing that it shared the same "melancholy feeling" as its parent series. Other reviews were not as positive. Grace Z. Li of Vulture called the special "disappointing" even while praising the performance of BMO. Dave Trumbore of Collider singled out the pacing for critique, writing that the special seemed rushed "when it comes to story beats and character development."

A number of reviewers commented on the episode's social commentary. The voice-actress for Y5, Glory Curda, argued that Y5's story has a lot of context and is representative of coming out into one's identity, defining the self with whatever terms are comfortable for a person. Alexander Sowa of CBR argued that Hugo is a futurist akin to Elon Musk or Steve Jobs, whose characterization is "a clear satire of modern-day corporations and capitalists." Sowa also argued that contra Hugo—a capitalist and colonist who "destroys the world around him"—Y5 can be seen as a fighter for equity who pushes for a new form of social organization that is fairer to the inhabitants of the Drift. Joe Matar of Den of Geek noted similar themes, saying that the story is about those living in Drift realizing that "their Elon Musk-esque tech capitalist overlord [Hugo] is destroying their world," which forces them to come together and rely on one another. Robert Lloyd of the Los Angeles Times likewise noted that the special hints at social commentary toward the end, referring to the destruction of Earth, the nature of resource management, the importance of cooperation, and "the way that certain human billionaires look at space as an escape pod."

"Obsidian" 
Writing for The A.V. Club, William Hughes gave this episode an A, calling it "fan service at its finest" with "plenty of the usual lovely Adventure Time touches". Additionally, Rebecca Long also gave a positive review of the episode for Polygon. She wrote that the episode gives fans the "emotional payoff and answers" they have been yearning for and that the special uses the plot to explore Marceline's childhood trauma, her romantic history with Bubblegum, how the two are interconnected, and fills in gaps about her past. Long also stated that while the special is not "as offbeat" as BMO, it is heavier in terms of emotional weight and plot, and making clear that "romantic subtext" in the original show has "always been straight-up text." At the same time, she states that not all interactions between Bubblegum and Marceline are loving, that the special has flaws due to a conventional structure and storytelling, even with some "inconsistencies in Princess Bubblegum's character design," but is still heartfelt and effective, complete with new music, with Marceline and Bubblegum having "a shared future that feels real." The episode was nominated for a GLAAD Media Award, taking place in 2021, for Outstanding Kids & Family Programming, praised for using the plot to explore Marceline's childhood trauma, her romantic history with Bubblegum, how the two are interconnected, and for giving  Marceline and Princess Bubblegum a "shared future that feels real."

Rosie Knight of IGN wrote that the special was a "perfect example of why [Adventure Time] made such a huge impact." Knight contended that the special's strongest asset was "how accessible it is to new viewers", given that both "hardcore fans" as well as new viewers who had little understanding of the characters could still come together and "enjoy this fantastical romp about aging, falling in love, and settling down". Knight further complimented the special for its message that Marceline's power comes from her love of Bubblegum. Knight also applauded the "Monster", which she argued is as iconic as "I'm Just Your Problem" (from season three's "What Was Missing") and "Everything Stays" (from Stakes). Knight concluded her review by noting that while the special could be seen as mere "fan service", it is "fan service of the highest order", "a wonderful animated episode", and "a fitting addition to Adventure Times legacy." Petrana Radulovic of Polygon argued that 2020, when it came to all-ages animation, was a "glorious gay celebration that was unheard of just five years ago," the development of Marceline and Bubblegum's relationship in the "Obsidian" episode. She specifically said that Obsidian was a "perfect end to this big gay year in animation," while noting that there is still work to do going forward.

Alexander Sowa of CBR described the episode as "a story about time," including various flashbacks, and is a story about immortals, with Sowa saying that Bubblegum and Marceline will "remain young at heart" even as their human companions die. Sean Cubillas had a similar description. He stated that the episode had "plenty of emotion and heart," adding that the episode showed that Marceline has grown up from what she was like in the original series, how Bonnie and Marcy met one another, and how they broke up in the past. At the same time, Princess Weekes of The Mary Sue, before the episode aired, said she found it reassuring because for queer representation "it is important to acknowledge that loving someone doesn't fix emotional issues or personality flaws." At the close of 2020, The New York Times named "Obsidian" one of "best TV episodes" of the year, calling it "the best excuse for [HBO Max's] existence."

"Together Again" 
The episode was received positively. Rollin Bishop of ComicBook described it as a whirlwind "tour through fantastical worlds," with jokes, callbacks, and brotherly love. Bishop also called it an "emotional roller coaster" and compared it to the previous special "Obsidian." Caroline Gao of Den of Geek described the episode as well-adjusted to the long format with a dark tone. Gao also compared the relationship between Finn and Jake in the episode, to the relationship between Princess Bubblegum and Marceline in "Obsidian," concluding that while it is not as profound as the series finale "Come Along With Me," it "fits into the middle of an Adventure Time season" rather than a bonus episode that follows the series finale. Eric Kohn of IndieWire argued that the episode is "endearing, nice-to-have fan service" that isn't as ingenious as the show, but there is plenty to enjoy, with the reappearance various characters, and said it has a touching moment that resembles Pixar's movie, Soul. Petrana Radulovic of Polygon noted that while "BMO" and "Obsidian" specials have showcased emotions and tried to answer deeper questions, this special begins with a quest, then turns into "something poignant," and becomes an "emotional rollercoaster." Radulovic said that other than the character reappearances, the special is visually gorgeous," and serves almost a metaphor for the journey that Finn and Jake undertake in the show itself, calling the episode a "beautiful, powerful, poignant ending" which captures the emotional depth of Adventure Time itself. Reuben Baron of CBR called the special "pretty much perfect," with the biggest adventure in the episode as death, with the Jake and Finn going on an "epic heroic adventure," willing to give each other's lives so they can reincarnate. He also called the special a great "ending to Finn and Jake's story."

"Wizard City" 
Compared to previous episodes, critical reception to "Wizard City" was more mixed. Kyle Logan of Cultured Vultures felt that the special was tonally disconnected from the original series, and he argued that while "Wizard City" is ostensibly focused on Peppermint Butler, the special fails to portray the character in a way that made him a fan-favorite in the first place. Logan ultimately argued that the special fails to deliver on its story potential. Alejandra Bodden of Bleeding Cool was surprised by the number of deaths in the episode; she wrote that while she enjoyed Peps, she found the special's plot to be "kind of a fucked up story and situation to be in." Although she felt that "Wizard City" was the weakest out of the four Distant Lands episodes, Bodden wrote that it was still an enjoyable experience overall. Writing for Bubble Blabber, David Kaldor wrote that the episode was a strange conclusion to the Distant Lands specials. Kaldor felt that, in terms of writing, the special was "pretty adequate", but he felt that it lacked the emotional punch of the previous three episodes.

Reuben Baron of Comic Book Resources contrasted the episode to the sixth-season episode "Gold Stars" and the ninth-season episode "Whispers," given similar themes in all three; despite the runtime of the latter two episode being around 20 minutes, Baron felt that they were more interesting than the 40-minutes "Wizard City", which he argued was derivative. Autumn Wright of We Got This Covered wrote that "Wizard City" was defined by an ethos of "queer living, not just queer moments": some non-human characters are more unconventional in gender. A side character named Blaine, for instance, is one-eyed and sometimes regarded as a boy; he sometimes wears skirt and is addressed with they/them. Peps and Cadebra are  roommates despite having different genders, and characters wear uniforms with pants, shorts or skirts. Wright commented that "Wizard City" is a step ahead compared to the representation seen in The Owl House and She-Ra and the Princesses of Power, even though the latter two "sport headline-grabbing relationships."

Accolades

Music

BMO's Mixtape (2020) 
The album, "BMO's Mixtape (Gilligan Moss Mix)" was released on September 18, 2020. It is not a soundtrack of the "BMO" special, but features remixed music from the original series, as well as a mix of the song "Eternity With You" from the "Obsidian" special. The album is mixed by the American musical duo Gilligan Moss.

"Obsidian" soundtrack (2020) 
The soundtrack to "Obsidian" was released on November 20, 2020. The album also features a promotional cover of the song "Monster" sung by American singer-songwriter King Princess. This track was released as a single on November 13, 2020.

Home media 

The series was released on DVD and Blu-ray on March 8, 2022.

References

External links 

2020 American television series debuts
2021 American television series endings
2020s American animated television series
2020s American LGBT-related animated television series
Adventure Time
HBO Max original programming
American animated television spin-offs
American children's animated adventure television series
American children's animated comic science fiction television series
American children's animated science fantasy television series
Animated television series about brothers
Animated television series about dogs
Animated television series about orphans
Television series by Cartoon Network Studios
English-language television shows
Post-apocalyptic animated television series
LGBT speculative fiction television series